Doug Lund was the former co-anchor of the 5 and 6 news at KELO-TV.

Biography
As a child, Doug Lund dreamed of being on television.  He reported that  the personalities at KELO-TV were idols of his; and, years later, they became his colleagues.

In 1974, Doug Lund started his career at KELO-TV as a commercial announcer.  In 1975, he joined the Keloland news team; and, he and Steve Hemmingsen co-anchored of the 10pm newscast.  In 1977, Lund and Hemmingsen co-anchored the 6pm newscast for the next twenty-five years.  Later, Lund was moved from the 10pm newscast to the new 5pm newscast.

Doug Lund's last newscast was broadcast on December 29, 2006.  KELO-TV aired a special on Doug Lund's career entitled, Doug Lund: 32 Years at Large.

External links
Doug Lund's biography
Doug Lund Retiring

People from Sioux Falls, South Dakota
South Dakota television anchors
South Dakota television reporters
Year of birth missing (living people)
Living people
Journalists from South Dakota